Laurence Edward "Skip" Scriven (19312007) was an American chemical engineer, educator, and a Regents Professor in the Department of Chemical Engineering and Materials Science at University of Minnesota.  He achieved numerous breakthroughs in the fields of fluid mechanics, capillary hydrodynamics, coating flows, and microscopy.  His contributions to chemical engineering have been internationally recognized, and he was elected fellow of the National Academy of Engineering (1978), American Academy of Arts and Sciences (1991), and American Institute of Chemical Engineers. Scriven was awarded the Josiah Willard Gibbs Lectureship organized by the American Mathematical Society in 1986. Prior to his academic career, he published works related to bubbles and surface flows while he was employed by the Shell Development Company in Emeryville, California.

Research and education 
Scriven made contributions in the fields of capillary hydrodynamics, bubble growth dynamics, gradient theory, interfacial phenomena and the theory of bicontinuous structures, enhanced oil recovery, wetting transition, cryogenic electron microscopy, Galerkin weighted residuals in finite element methods, and coating process fundamentals.

His most highly cited papers include The Marangoni Effects (American Institute of Chemical Engineering Journal, 1959; Nature, 1960), Angular Momentum of Continua (Nature, 1961), Flow caused by an Air-lubricated Edge moving over Viscoelastic Liquid (Nature, 1973), a foundational explanation of the origin of bicontinuous structures (Nature, 1976), and a description of an apparatus that allows fast freezing of complex liquid specimens for cryomicroscopy (Journal of Electron Microscopy Technique, 1988). His 1988 paper "Physics and Applications of Dip Coating and Spin Coating" is widely referenced in various industries.

Scriven advised over 100 Ph.D. students during his career in the Department of Chemical Engineering and Materials Science at the University of Minnesota. He co-founded NSF Center for Interfacial Engineering at the University of Minnesota.

Awards 

Among the recognition given to him, recent awards include: American Chemical Society's Murphree Award, American Chemical Society's Roy W. Tess Award, American Institute of Chemical Engineers' Tallmadge Award, American Institute of Chemical Engineers' Founders Award, American Institute of Chemical Engineers' William Walker Award, and Federation of Societies of Coatings Technology's Roon Award(with Yue Ma, Benjamin J. Wiley, and H.T. Davis).

Scriven has written numerous articles of historical importance within the field of chemical engineering. He also shared some thoughts on the future of the field in an article:

Key Publications 

Scriven has authored numerous journal articles. Some examples are listed below.

L.E. Scriven. "On the dynamics of phase growth", Chemical Engineering Science, 10(1-2), 1–13, (1959) on Citation Classic, Jul 28, 1980
L.E. Scriven, C.V. Sternling. "The Marangoni Effects", Nature, 187, 186–188, (1960).
L.E. Scriven. "Dynamics of a fluid interface Equation of motion for Newtonian surface fluids", Chemical Engineering Science, 12(2), 98, (1960).
L.E. Scriven, C.V. Sternling. "On cellular convection driven by surface-tension gradients: effects of mean surface tension and surface viscosity", Journal of Fluid Mechanics, 19(3), 321–340, (1964).
B. A. Finlayson, L. E. Scriven. "The method of weighted residuals—a review", Applied Mechanics Reviews, 19:735-48 (1966) on Citation Classic, Oct. 3, 1983
Chun Huh, L.E. Scriven. "Hydrodynamic model of steady movement of a solid/liquid/fluid contact line", Journal of Colloid and Interface Science, 35(1), 85–101, (1971).
L.E. Scriven. "Equilibrium bicontinuous structure", Nature, 263, 123–125, (1976).
Perspectives in Chemical Engineering, edited by C. K. Colton (Academic Press, 1991, vol. 16, pp. 1–40)
D.J. Norris, E.G. Arlinghaus, L. Meng, R. Heiny, L.E. Scriven. "Opaline Photonic Crystals: How Does Self‐Assembly Work?", Advanced Materials, 16(16), 1393, (2004).

Legacy 
In honor of Scriven, the International Society of Coating Science and Technology established the L. E. Scriven Young Investigator Award.

L. E. “Skip” Scriven Chair is an Endowed Professorship at the University of Minnesota.

References

University of Minnesota faculty
American chemical engineers
1931 births
2007 deaths
University of California, Berkeley alumni
University of Delaware alumni
Minnesota CEMS